Sergei Kiriyenko's Cabinet (March 23, 1998 - August 23, 1998) was the sixth cabinet of government of the Russian Federation, preceded by Viktor Chernomyrdin's Second Cabinet and followed by Yevgeny Primakov's Cabinet. It was led by Prime Minister Sergey Kiriyenko, appointed acting Prime Minister on March 23 and proposed to the State Duma for approvement on March 27, 1998. On April 10 and April 17 Duma disapproved him as Prime Minister twice (April 10: 143 in favor, 186 against, 5 abstained, April 17: 115 in favor, 271 against, 11 abstained), but on the third time on April 24 he was approved by the State Duma (251 in favor, 25 against) and appointed Prime Minister by the President. According to the Constitution of Russia, if the State Duma rejects the President's nomination three times, it must be dissolved and a parliamentary election held.

According to the Russian legislation, the ministers were appointed by the President.

On August 23, 1998 Yeltsin sacked the government after the 1998 Russian financial crisis had taken a dramatic turn on August 17, replaced Kiriyenko with Viktor Chernomyrdin as acting Prime Minister, although he had been neither a deputy nor even a member of the cabinet of Kiriyenko as required by law, and reappointed all the other ministers as acting ministers. 

Fourteen ministers survived the reshuffle (see Yevgeny Primakov's Cabinet).

See also
 1998 Russian financial crisis

Ministers

|}

References

External links
Kiriyenko's Cabinet (in Russian)

Kiriyenko
1998 in Russia
Cabinets established in 1998
Cabinets disestablished in 1998